João Victor Donna Bravim (born 3 May 1998) is a Brazilian professional footballer who plays as a goalkeeper for Casa Pia.

Professional career
Bravim is a youth product of the Brazilian clubs Rio Branco, América Mineiro, Cruzeiro and Santos, before moving to Portugal with Alverca in 2018. He began his senior career with Alverca in the Portuguese third division in the 2019–20 season. He transferred to LigaPro side Casa Pia on 1 October 2020, where he acted as reserve goalkeeper. After helping them achieve promotion into the Primeira Liga for the 2022–23 season, Bravim extended his contract with Casa Pia on 13 June 2022.

Personal life
Born in Brazil, Bravim is of Italian descent.

References

External links
 
 Desporto.Sapo profile

1998 births
Living people
Sportspeople from Espírito Santo
Brazilian footballers
Brazilian people of Italian descent
Association football goalkeepers
F.C. Alverca players
Casa Pia A.C. players
Primeira Liga players
Liga Portugal 2 players
Campeonato de Portugal (league) players
Brazilian expatriate footballers
Brazilian expatriates in Portugal
Expatriate footballers in Portugal